La Lupa is a Swiss singer and performer known in the Alps region for her eclectic stage performances while wearing colorful, eccentric costumes.

Biography 
She was born Maryli Maura Marconi in the Onsernone valley in the canton of Ticino, on February 9, 1947. She was given the name La Lupa when she was a teenager and kept it as her stage name. When he was 20 years old, she went to Zurich, where she lives.

Career 

Her first public performance was in 1980, when she played the leading role in the open-air play "Der Suppastai" with singer-songwriter Walter Liethaof in the Arcas-Platz de Chur, Swiss canton of the Grisons. Since then, she has produced around two dozen solo programs, often presented in Zurich spaces such as the Kunsthaus and the Stock Theater, accompanied by musicians Fortunat Frölich, Fabian Müller and Hieronymus Schädler on the stage, under the direction of Polish musician Michal Ratynski.

Her productions and audio recordings include musical renderings from poets like Dante Alighieri, Kahlil Gibran, Guillaume Apollinaire, Angelo Poliziano, Rabindranath Tagore, Hildegard von Bingen, Pablo Neruda, Federico Garcia Lorca, Francesco Petrarca, Salvatore Quasimodo, Friedrich Schiller, Biagio Marin, and Fernando Pessoa.<

She made a USA tour in 1993, during which she performed in New York and Washington, and she also had performances in Stockholm, Paris, Kyiv, Napoli, Venice, Cairo and Amsterdam. In 1992 she performed at the EXPO'92 in Seville. Freshness, fusion of soul and core, ingenuity, and juxtaposed cultural richness are traits mentioned by commentators to describe La Lupa's art. La Lupa's own definition of happiness is: "Happiness is when the struggle for life turns into the dance of life."

Media 
A documentary about her life, directed by Lucienne Lanaz, was released in 1999. Interviews with the artist from the Neue Zürcher Zeitung (2018) and the Italian National Radio (2021) are available online.

Works

Selected recordings 
 Con Malizia E Passione ‎(LP, Album); Folk, World, & Country;  Zytglogge, ZYT 240, 1982.
 Cammino E Canto ‎(LP); Jazz, Rock, Pop,  Contrabass - Fumio Shirato, Saxophone, Flute - Mario Giovanoli, Violin - Urs Walker, Vocals - La Lupa; Zytglogge, ZYT 250, 1984.
 L'Amor Che Si Consuma (LP, CD); Folk, World, & Country; Cello - Fortunat Frölich, Viola Urzli Senn, Clarinet/Accordion - Hans Hassler, Vocals - La Lupa; Zytglogge, ZYT 265, 1988.
 Poesie E Canzoni ‎(CD, Album); Folk, World, & Country, Viola - Urzli Senn, Vocals - La Lupa; Zytglogge, ZYT 4297, 1993.
 La Gira La Röda - Grazie Alla Vita, Folk, World, & Country, Viola-Urzli Senn, Violoncello-Fortunat Frölich, Vocals-La Lupa; ‎(CD, Album), Zytglogge, ZYR 4540, 1995.
 L'Odore Di Libertà ‎(CD, Album), Folk, World, & Country; Cellos - Fabian Müller, Fortunat Frölich, Vocals – La Lupa; Jecklin Red Note, JC 106-2, 1996.
 Amor ‎(CD, Album);  Classical, Folk, World, & Country;  Saxophone - Harry Kinross White, Cello/arrangements - Fabian Müller, Vocals - La Lupa; MGB, CD 6188, 2002.

Publications 

 
 *

References

External links 

 La Lupa's discography at Discogs
 Website von La Lupa
 Presseartikel über La Lupa
 Tonaufnahmen von La Lupa in der Schweizerischen Nationalphonothek (hörbar nur in speziellen Stationen in Schweizer Bibliotheken)

Swiss singers
Living people
1947 births